This article describes the qualification for the 2015 IFAF World Championship. The final tournament was to be contested by twelve teams, but five teams that later qualify withdrew from the tournament. Sweden qualified automatically as original hosts of the tournament but was among the teams that withdrew. The United States hosted the tournament instead and would have still automatically qualified as the defending world champions if Sweden did not withdraw from the tournament.

Asian qualifiers

South Korea vs. Kuwait

The Kuwait Gridiron Football National team lost the first Asian World Championship Qualifier against Korea by a score of 69–7.

Japan vs. Philippines
Japan defeated Philippines 86–0 in Tokyo to secure a spot in the final tournament.

2014 European Championship
The European participants won a seed in the tournament by finishing top-3 in the 2014 EFAF European Championship.

Germany vs. Austria

The first seed is for Germany for being the champion and the second is Austria who was the runner-up. Both teams played the gold medal game were 
the defending champion Germany won during overtime the host team Austria by a score of 30 to 27.
 Box score

Finland vs. France

The last seed was for the third place France by beating Finland during the European Championship bronze medal game with a score of 35 to 21.
 Box score

African qualifiers

Egypt vs. Morocco

The first participation of Africa on the IFAF World Championship Competition. The qualifier was decided in one game the December 13, 2014. Between the two teams Egypt and Morocco. It was held in Cairo, Egypt.

American qualifiers
The United States qualified automatically as the 2011 IFAF World Championship winners.

IFAF Americas have three more spots; the first two will be represented by Canada and Mexico respectively, these countries qualified directly by finishing second and fourth at the last World Championship.

Panama vs. Brazil

Panama as the champion of the Central American Bowl will play a game for the last seed in the road to the IFAF World Championship 2015, facing the national team of Brazil. The game is going to be held on January 31, 2015, being Panama the host nation.

Oceanian Qualifier

References

2015 in American football
IFAF World Championship